Turner-Fairbank Highway Research Center is a U.S. Department of Transportation facility located in McLean, Virginia. The center carries out research studies and was renamed after Francis Turner in 1983. It had been known as the Fairbank Highway Research Station for Herbert S. Fairbank, an official at FHWA's predecessor, the Bureau of Public Roads. It is located adjacent to the Central Intelligence Agency headquarters.

History of TFHRC
 1938: Congress responded to a growing public need for dedicated highway research by acquiring 235.3 hectares (581 acres) of land in McLean, VA, for a roadway research facility.
 1941: The beginning of World War II interrupted building construction at the research facility.
 1950: After the war, funding was limited, and it was not until 1950 that the two original buildings, built on 17.8 hectares (44 acres) of the original purchase, were ready for occupancy. The Bureau of Public Roads moved to the McLean site, which was named the Langley Research Station.
 1960s: In 1963, the site was renamed the Fairbank Highway Research Station, honoring Herbert S. Fairbank, the former Deputy Commissioner of Research for the Bureau of Public Roads (1944 to 1955). Land from the original site was transferred to the Central Intelligence Agency, the National Park Service, and the State of Virginia. Extensive modifications over the years improved the facilities but could not meet the growing needs of the national highway research and development program. Plans for expansion began in 1967.
 1980s: In 1980, construction began on a third building. Completed in 1983, this building was dedicated to Francis C. Turner, the first Administrator of the Federal Highway Administration to serve his entire career with the agency, and the research station was renamed the Turner-Fairbank Highway Research Center. The Turner Building provides 7,432 square meters (80,000 square feet) of laboratory, office, and support service space.
 TFHRC now has more than 24 indoor and outdoor laboratories and support facilities. Approximately 300 Federal employees, onsite contract employees, and students are currently engaged in or supporting transportation research at TFHRC.

References

External links
 

United States Department of Transportation agencies
McLean, Virginia